Žemaičiai ('The Samogitians') is a village in Kėdainiai district municipality, in Kaunas County, in central Lithuania. According to the 2011 census, the village has a population of 12 people. It is located 4 km from Dotnuva, by the Jaugila river and Krakės-Dotnuva forest. The old lime alley goes along the way from Akademija, Kėdainiai to Žemaičiai.

Demography

References

Villages in Kaunas County
Kėdainiai District Municipality